Kirby Keyes Wilson (born August 24, 1961) is an American football coach who has previously served as a running backs coach in the National Football League (NFL) for 23 seasons. He coached for the New England Patriots, Washington Redskins, Tampa Bay Buccaneers, Pittsburgh Steelers, Minnesota Vikings, Cleveland Browns, Arizona Cardinals and Oakland / Las Vegas Raiders. He was previously the head coach for the Pittsburgh Maulers of the  United States Football League (USFL).

Playing career

High school
Wilson prepped at Dorsey High School in Los Angeles.

College
Wilson played at the University of Illinois after transferring from Pasadena City College.

He obtained a bachelor of arts degree from Eastern Illinois University in 1989.

Canadian Football League
Wilson played two seasons in the Canadian Football League as a defensive back and kick returner for the Winnipeg Blue Bombers and Toronto Argonauts between 1983 and 1984.

Coaching career

College
At the college level, Wilson has coached at Pasadena City College, Los Angeles Southwest College, Southern Illinois, Wyoming, USC and Iowa State. Kirby is a member of Iota Phi Theta fraternity.

Prior to making the jump to the NFL, he coached Iowa State running back Troy Davis to a year where he ran for over 2,000 yards in 1995 and over 2,100 yards in 1996.

New England Patriots
In 1997, Wilson was hired by the New England Patriots as their running backs coach.

Washington Redskins
In 2000, Wilson was hired by the Washington Redskins as their running backs coach.

Tampa Bay Buccaneers
In 2002, Wilson was hired by the Tampa Bay Buccaneers as their running backs coach.

Arizona Cardinals
In 2004, Wilson was hired by the Arizona Cardinals as their running backs coach.

Pittsburgh Steelers
In January 2007, Wilson was hired by the Pittsburgh Steelers as their running backs coach, after the retirement of Dick Hoak. He was hired when Mike Tomlin took over the team, following Bill Cowher's resignation.

Minnesota Vikings
In 2014, Wilson was hired by the Minnesota Vikings as their running backs coach.

Cleveland Browns
In 2016, Wilson was hired by the Cleveland Browns as their running backs coach.

Return to Arizona
On February 14, 2018, Wilson returned to the Arizona Cardinals after they hired him as their running backs coach.

Oakland / Las Vegas Raiders
On February 15, 2019, Wilson was hired by the Oakland Raiders as their running backs coach.

On July 16, 2021, Wilson announced his retirement.

Pittsburgh Maulers 
On January 20, 2022, Wilson was named Head coach of the Pittsburgh Maulers of the United States Football League (USFL).

Wilson cut running back De'Veon Smith for violating team rules three times in a 24-hour period, notably disrespecting a cafeteria worker before the USFL season began, drawing major controversy over social media platforms from fans.

Head coaching record

References 

1961 births
Living people
Pittsburgh Steelers coaches
USC Trojans football coaches
Illinois Fighting Illini football players
New England Patriots coaches
Washington Redskins coaches
Winnipeg Blue Bombers players
Toronto Argonauts players
Southern Illinois Salukis football coaches
Wyoming Cowboys football coaches
Iowa State Cyclones football coaches
Tampa Bay Buccaneers coaches
Arizona Cardinals coaches
Pasadena City Lancers football players
Pasadena City Lancers football coaches
Eastern Illinois University alumni
Minnesota Vikings coaches
Cleveland Browns coaches
Susan Miller Dorsey High School alumni
Las Vegas Raiders coaches 
Oakland Raiders coaches
Pittsburgh Maulers (2022) coaches